Carabus marietti ormanensis is a subspecies of beetle from the family Carabidae, that is endemic to Turkey. The subspecies are brown-coloured with golden pronotum.

References

marietti ormanensis
Beetles described in 1967
Endemic fauna of Turkey